La Cerlangue is a commune in the Seine-Maritime department in the Normandy region in northern France.

Geography
The canal de Tancarville and the A131 autoroute cut through the middle of the commune. The river Seine forms the commune's southern border.

Population

Places of interest
 The church of St. Leonard, dating from the thirteenth century.
 The eleventh century church of St.Jean-d'Abbetot.

See also
Communes of the Seine-Maritime department

References

External links

Official website 

Communes of Seine-Maritime